No Smoke may refer to:
 No Smoke (Michelle Lawson song)
 No Smoke (YoungBoy Never Broke Again song)
 No Smoke, a song by Gucci Mane from the album The Return of East Atlanta Santa
 No Smoke, a song by The Game from the album Born 2 Rap